The following are notable people who were either born, raised or have lived for a significant period of time in Prizren.

List 

 Almen Abdi, Swiss international football player
 Eshref Ademaj, mathematician and education activist
 Jake Allex, American Medal of Honor recipient
 Süleyman Askerî, army officer of the Ottoman Empire.
 Arjan Beqaj, Albanian international football player
 Llukë Bogdani, Albanian poet
 Pjetër Bogdani, Albanian writer
 Nikollë Bojaxhiu, Albanian businessman, politician, and the father of Mother Teresa
 Burim Myftiu, Visual Artist, Curator and Photographer
 Petrit Çeku, Albanian classical guitarist
 Bersant Celina, Albanian-Norwegian footballer
 Ivica Dačić, Serbian politician, former Prime Minister of Serbia
 Bekim Fehmiu, Albanian actor
 Elder Grigorije, Serbian Orthodox clergyman and writer
 Shaban Gashi, Cinematographer and photographer
 Sima Igumanov, Serbian merchant who made a fortune through tobacco trade
 Vuk Isaković, Serb military commander in Austrian service during the Austrian-Ottoman Wars
 Joanikije II, first Serbian Patriarchate of Peć
 Katarina Josipi, Albanian actress
 Anđelko Karaferić, Serbian musician, Professor of Counterpoint and Associate Dean at the University of Pristina Faculty of Arts
 Matej Krasniqi, Albanian Catholic cleric
 Lazar the Serb, Serbian Orthodox monk who invented and built the first known mechanical public clock in Russia in 1404
 Mark Marku, Albanian singer
 Pjetër Mazreku, Albanian Archbishop of Bar and Bishop of Prizren
 Arta Muçaj, Albanian actress
 Dejan Musli, Serbian basketball player
 Vedat Muriqi, Albanian footballer
 Jordan Nikolić, Serbian folk singer who interpreted traditional songs from Kosovo
 Ymer Prizreni, founding member and leader of the League of Prizren
 Kujtim Shala, former Croatian international football player
 Čolak Anta Simeonović, Serbian commander and one of the most important figures of the First Serbian Uprising
 Nenad Stojković, Serbian football player
 Tayna, Albanian singer
 Edis Tatli, Finnish boxer

Prizren